Hengshan District is a district of the city of Yulin, Shaanxi province, China, bordering Inner Mongolia to the northwest.

Administrative divisions
As 2019, Hengshan District is divided to 5 subdistricts and 13 towns.
Subdistricts

Towns

Climate

Transport
 Shenmu–Yan'an Railway

References

Districts of Shaanxi
Yulin, Shaanxi